Fritz Retter (2 July 1896 – 1 January 1965) was a German international footballer.

References

1896 births
1965 deaths
Association football midfielders
German footballers
Germany international footballers